OrlandoCon, also known as O'Con, was a long-running comic book fan convention which was held annually between 1974 and 1996 in Orlando, Florida. The first comic book convention held in the Orlando area, OrlandoCon billed itself as a "Central Florida comic art convention and early TV/film festival." Captain Marvel-creator C. C. Beck was a regular guest of the show; as were many other Golden Age of Comic Books creators who lived in the Orlando area.

The founders of OrlandoCon were regional chairman of the National Cartoonists Society Jim Ivey, and local enthusiasts Charlie Roberts, Richard Kravitz, Rob Word, and Neil Austin. Most OrlandoCons took place over a September weekend.

Events and activities 
Each year's show featured a banquet for attending cartoonists and the presentation to the guest of honor of a gold brick called the Ignatz Award named in honor of George Herriman's Krazy Kat. Recipients of the Ignatz included Don Martin, Joe Kubert, Martin Nodell, and Don Addis. (The OrlandoCon Ignatz Award is not connected to the current award of the same name presented annually at the Bethesda, Maryland-based Small Press Expo.)

Each show featured a charity auction to benefit the Milt Gross Fund of the National Cartoonists Society. The OrlandoCon often featured screenings of early TV shows, as well as panels, seminars, and workshops with comic book professionals. In addition, there was a floorspace for exhibitors, including comic book dealers and collectibles merchants. The show included an autograph area, as well as an Artists' Alley where comics artists signed autographs and sold or produced free sketches.

History
The first OrlandoCon was held in September 1974 at the Orlando Howard Johnson's Convention Center — guests include C. C. Beck, Roy Crane, Hal Foster, Ron Goulart, Les Turner, Ralph Dunagin, Bill Crooks, Harold McCauley, "Scorchy Smith" artist Edmund Good, and Disney artist Ralph Kent.

In 1976 OrlandoCon moved venues from the Howard Johnson Convention Center to the International Inn, where the convention stayed for most of the rest of its existence.

Even though he moved to Pennsylvania in 1974, Charlie Roberts stayed with the OrlandoCon as co-organizer with Jim Ivey until 1979, at which point small press publisher Bill Black became involved with the convention.

With the collapse of the comic book speculating market in 1993, the show petered out. One of the final OrlandoCons was produced by local retailer Mike Kott on September 10–11, 1994, at the Clarion Towers; guests include show founder Jim Ivey and Martin Nodell.

Locations and dates

Legacy 
The huge Orlando-based multi-genre convention MegaCon was inaugurated in 1993 and is the spiritual successor of OrlandoCon; it continues to this day.

References

External links 
 Holtz, Allan. "Jim Ivey's Photo Album, Part One," Stripper's Guide blog (Jan. 30, 2007)
 Holtz, Allan. "eBay Head's Up & Orlandocon Memories," Stripper's Guide blog (Feb. 15, 2007)
 Jim Ivey's Sunday Comic about OrlandoCon

1974 establishments in Florida
1994 disestablishments in Florida
Defunct comics conventions
Events in Orlando, Florida
Recurring events disestablished in 1994
Recurring events established in 1974
Conventions in Florida